Belite Aircraft was an American aircraft manufacturer based in Wichita, Kansas and founded by James and Kathy Wiebe in 2009. The company specialized in the design and manufacture of ultralight aircraft in the form of  kits for amateur construction and ready-to-fly complete aircraft under the US FAR 103 Ultralight Vehicles rules.

The company was formed to produce the Belite Aircraft Superlite, a derivative of the Kitfox Lite single-seat ultralight design. They "...acquired the production rights to a previously designed aircraft, the Kitfox Lite" and they "...acquired the tooling, existing parts and manufacturing rights to the aircraft in March of 2009. As a condition of the transaction, they agreed to rebrand the airplane to prevent any confusion with the larger, two-place light sport Kitfox".

In January 2010, at the U.S. Sport Aviation Expo in Sebring, Florida, the company debuted two variants of the company's initial Belite 254: its "easy-to-land" tricycle-geared Trike, and its "higher performance" Superlite, a lighter-weight, higher-powered "STOL" (short takeoff and landing) version.

In 2013 the company flew the floatplane version of its new Belite Ultra Cub design, designated the Belite Sealite.

On 6 June 2019, the Belite facility was destroyed by fire and the company ceased operating.

Aircraft

References

External links

Official website archives on Archive.org

Aircraft manufacturers of the United States
Ultralight aircraft
Homebuilt aircraft